Lost Dutchman's Gold is a 1979 video game designed by Terry Kepner (as "Teri Li") and published by The Software Exchange for the TRS-80 16K.

Contents
Lost Dutchman's Gold is a text adventure in which the player searches for gold hidden in the desert.

Reception
Jon Mishcon reviewed Lost Dutchman's Gold in The Space Gamer No. 34. Mishcon commented that "Overall, a good game of the adventure genre, well worth its reasonable price, but certainly not the best of its class."

References

1979 video games
Adventure games
TRS-80 games
TRS-80-only games
Video games developed in the United States